The Ryan & Company Lumber Yard (also known as Ryan Bros., Inc.) is a historic site in Apopka, Florida. It is located at 215 East Fifth Street. On February 25, 1993, it was added to the U.S. National Register of Historic Places.

References

External links
 Orange County listings at National Register of Historic Places
 Florida's Office of Cultural and Historical Programs
 Orange County listings
 Ryan Brothers, Inc.

National Register of Historic Places in Orange County, Florida
Timber industry
Apopka, Florida